Mahru may refer to:
Mahru Rural District, an administrative subdivision of Iran
MAHRU, a model robot